The 20827 / 20828 Jabalpur - Santragachi Humsafar Express  is a superfast express train of the Indian Railways connecting Santragachi in West Bengal and Jabalpur in Madhya Pradesh. It is currently being operated with 20827/20828 train numbers on a weekly basis.

Coach Composition 

The trains is completely 3-tier AC sleeper trains designed by Indian Railways with features of LED screen display to show information about stations, train speed etc. and will have announcement system as well, Vending machines for tea, coffee and milk, Bio toilets in compartments as well as CCTV cameras.

Service

The 20827/Jabalpur - Santragachi Humsafar Express has an average speed of 56 km/hr, and covers 1117 km in 19h 50m.

The 20828/Santragachi - Jabalpur Humsafar Express has an average speed of 57 km/hr, and covers 1117 km in 19h 30m.

Route & Halts

Traction

Both trains are hauled by Santragachi Electric Loco Shed based WAP-7 locomotive.

Rake Sharing
The train shares its rake with 20821/20822 Santragachi-Pune Humsafar Express.

See also 
 Humsafar Express
 Jabalpur Junction railway station
 Santragachi Junction railway station

Notes

References 

Transport in Jabalpur
Humsafar Express trains
Rail transport in Madhya Pradesh
Rail transport in West Bengal
Railway services introduced in 2018